Dalnaglar Castle is a 19th-century castle, about  south of Spittal of Glenshee, Perth and Kinross, Scotland, on the east of the Shee Water.

History
It is thought that the estate was formed in the late 18th or early 19th century. ‘Dalnaglar Cottage’ seems to have been the precursor of and core to the present castle, which was probably built as a hunting lodge. The present baronial mansion or ‘castle’ was built in 1864 for Robertson, from Blairgowrie, banker to Queen Victoria.

Part of the castle is available as holiday accommodation.

Structure

The main block has two storeys and is harled; there are two towers, one of three storeys and the other of three storeys and an attic.

Historic Environment Scotland's comment is "Detail coarse and incorrect", while describing the whole as a "Mid-Victorian baronial curiosity".

Part of the ground may at one time have been set out in the style of a Japanese garden.

See also
Castles in Great Britain and Ireland
List of castles in Scotland

References	

Castles in Perth and Kinross